Colorado's 6th Senate district is one of 35 districts in the Colorado Senate. It has been represented by Republican Cleave Simpson since 2023. Prior to redistricting the district was represented by Republicans Don Coram and Ellen Roberts.

Geography
District 6 is based in Southwest Colorado, covering all of Archuleta, Dolores, La Plata, Montezuma, Montrose, Ouray, San Juan, and San Miguel Counties. Communities in the district include Montrose, Olathe, Ouray, Mountain Village, Telluride, Silverton, Dove Creek, Cortez, Mancos, Towaoc, Durango, Bayfield, and Pagosa Springs. The district is also home to the Southern Ute Indian Reservation.

The district is located entirely within Colorado's 3rd congressional district, and overlaps with the 58th and 59th districts of the Colorado House of Representatives. It borders the states of Utah, New Mexico, and – via Four Corners – Arizona.

Recent election results
Colorado state senators are elected to staggered four-year terms. The old 6th district held elections in midterm years, but the new district drawn following the 2020 Census will hold elections in presidential years.

Incumbent Senator Don Coram was redistricted into the 5th district, which also is not up for election this year, meaning Coram had no seat to run in; he ran unsuccessfully for Colorado's 3rd congressional district instead. 35th district Senator Cleave Simpson lives in the new boundaries of the 6th district, and will represent it beginning in 2023.

2018

2014

Federal and statewide results in District 6

References 

6
Archuleta County, Colorado
Dolores County, Colorado
La Plata County, Colorado
Montezuma County, Colorado
Montrose County, Colorado
Ouray County, Colorado
San Juan County, Colorado
San Miguel County, Colorado